Cercospora papayae is a fungal plant pathogen.

References

papayae
Fungal plant pathogens and diseases